The 2020 Lao Premier League is the 31st season of the Lao Premier League. The season started on 12 July 2020. It is played in triple round-robin format, with 15 total rounds.

Teams 
A total of 7 teams participate in the 2020 Lao League season.

Stadia
Note: Table lists in alphabetical order.

Foreign players
The number of foreign players is restricted to four per team. A team can use four foreign players on the field in each game, including at least one player from the AFC region.

Players name in bold indicates the player is registered during the mid-season transfer window.

League table

Results

References

External links
Lao Premier League website

Laos
Lao Premier League seasons
2020 in Laotian football